Imperial blue is a bright shade and a dark shade of azure blue. It may also refer to:
 Imperial Blue (whisky), an India Whiskey
 Imperial Blue (film), a 2019 British film directed by Dan Moss